Szendrey-Ramos v. First Bancorp, 512 F. Supp. 2d 81 (D.P.R. 2007), was a case decided in the district of Puerto Rico where the federal district court declined supplemental jurisdiction under 28 U.S.C. § 1367(c).

Factual background
Carmen Szendrey-Ramos worked for First Bancorp as their general counsel in Puerto Rico.  After investigating several possible ethics violations and illegal activities, Szendrey-Ramos was fired.  She sued First Bancorp under Title VII alleging discrimination and retaliation and for violations of the Puerto Rico constitution.  First Bancorp made a motion to dismiss the claims.

Decision
The district court allowed the Title VII claims to move forward, but declined to exercise supplemental jurisdiction over the Puerto Rico law claims.  The court reasoned that the Puerto Rico law claims would require Szendrey-Ramos to possibly divulge client information in litigation, an action regulated by Canon 21 of the Puerto Rico Code of Professional Ethics.  The court determined that the entanglement with Canon 21 created a novel and complex problem of Puerto Rico law, and that the Puerto Rico law claims would dominate the Title VII claims if supplemental jurisdiction was exercised.  For those reasons, the court declined to exercise supplemental jurisdiction over the Puerto Rico law claims.

References

External links
 

2007 in United States case law
United States district court cases
United States supplemental jurisdiction case law